Sante D'Orazio is an American photographer.

D'Orazio exhibited in the Kunsthaus Munich, Kunsthauswien Vienna, the L.A. County Museum, Kahmann Gallery (Amsterdam), Stellan Holm Gallery (New York), Cameraworks Gallery (Berlin) Hilario Galguera Gallery (Mexico City), and NRW Forum in Düsseldorf. His publications include: A Private View, Sante D'Orazio Photographs, Pam: American Icon, Katlick School, Gianni and Donatella, and Barely Private.

Books

A Private View. Penguin Books, 1998. . Photographs and diary pages covering his photography career.
Sante D'Orazio Photographs. Arena Editions, 2000. Photographs from his professional and personal work.
Pam: American Icon. Schirmer/Mosel, 2005. . Photographs of Pamela Anderson
Katlick School. teNeues, 2006.
Gianni and Donatella. teNeues, 2007.
Barely Private - A Diary Book 1997-Present. Taschen, 2009.

Exhibitions

2010 Scratch This, Hiliario Galuera Gallery, Leipzig, Germany (solo) In Dialogue, Anonymous Gallery/Collective Hardware, New York, NY (catalog).
2009 Barely Private, Milk Gallery, New York, NY (solo) Scratch This / A Film, Paradise Row Gallery, Frieze Art Fair, London.
2008 Pam: American Icon, Alain Noirhomme Galerie, Belgium Double Cross, NRW Forum, Duesseldorf, Germany Gianni and Donatella, Orvieto, Italy Untitled, Hilario  Gaguera Gallery, San Rafael, Mexico. 
2007 Katlick School, Stellan Holm Gallery, New York, NY.
2006 Retrospective, Kunsthausewien, Vienna, Austria.
2005 Pamela Anderson: Icon, Kunstaus, Munich, Germany Pamela Andersion: Icon, Stellan Holm Gal- lery, New York, NY.
2004 Pixels, Stellan Holm Gallery, New York, NY.
2003 Rolling Stones, Cameraworks Gallery, Berlin, Germany.

Personal life
D'Orazio was married to fashion model Kara Young from 1994 to 1998.They had one son together, Nickola, also a photographer.

References

Fashion photographers
1956 births
Living people
People from Brooklyn
Brooklyn College alumni
Photographers from New York City